Brotskjer is a rock about 11 miles (17 km) west-southwest of Håøya in the southern part of Thousand Islands, an archipelago south of Edgeøya.

References 

 Norwegian Polar Institute Place Names of Svalbard Database

Islands of Svalbard